Document cameras, also known as visual presenters, visualizers, digital overheads, or docucams, are real-time image capture devices for displaying an object to a large audience. Like an opaque projector, a document camera is able to magnify and project the images of actual, three-dimensional objects, as well as transparencies. They are, in essence, high resolution web cams, mounted on arms so as to facilitate their placement over a page. This allows a teacher, lecturer or presenter to write on a sheet of paper or to display a two or three-dimensional object while the audience watches. Theoretically, all objects can be displayed by a document camera. Most objects are simply placed under the camera. The camera takes the picture which in turn produces a live picture using a projector or monitor. Different types of document camera/visualizer allow great flexibility in terms of placement of objects. Larger objects, for example, can simply be placed in front of the camera and the camera rotated as necessary, or a ceiling mounted document camera can also be used to allow a larger working area to be used.

Uses
Typical 

 Lecture hall or classroom use
 Presentation of material in conferences, meetings and training sessions
 Videoconferencing and telepresence
 Presentation of evidence in courtrooms
 Various medical applications (telemedicine, telepathology, display of x-rays)

Document cameras replaced epidiascopes and overhead projectors, which were formerly used for this purpose. By means of the zoom feature a document camera can enlarge the small print in books and project a printed page as if it were a traditional transparency. Also, the room lighting does not have to be darkened to operate a document camera; in a classroom setting this is an asset. Most document cameras can also send a video signal to a computer via USB cable.  Sometimes document cameras are connected to an interactive whiteboard instead of a standard screen.

Some document cameras can be supplied with an accessory so that they can be used with a microscope.

, camera sensors in document cameras are mostly providing either 720pHD (1280x720 pixels) or 1080pHD (1920x1080 pixels) native image resolution.

History 

Document cameras were developed to meet an increased demand for the ability to project and present original documents, plans, drawings and objects directly, rather than necessitating the prior preparation, that would be required for their use as part of an overhead projector-based presentation. The first Visualizer/document camera were developed by the companies WolfVision and Elmo and were launched at the photokina Trade Fair in 1988.

The widespread use of computers, projectors, and popular presentation programs such as Microsoft PowerPoint in meeting rooms, meant that overhead projectors became less frequently used.  Document cameras continue to provide a convenient and flexible way of allowing documents, books or slides to be spontaneously displayed during presentations as required.

The first attempts and prototypes were mostly simple video cameras on a copy stand. During the mid-1970s these were assembled and equipped with additional lighting to ensure that they were able to operate in darkened rooms, and also to provide a consistent quality of projected image.  The technology of video cameras during this time, was a key factor in the development of document camera systems. Document cameras have also frequently benefited from developments in other industries, which also facilitated significant advances in the field of document camera technology. A good example of this is the technology used in photographic equipment, which has contributed much to the development of the document camera as a high-quality presentation tool.

At the end of the 1990s progressive scan cameras were introduced. Many visualizers available on the market today are capable of at least 30 frames per second output, which ensures high quality imaging and smoothness of motion in all resolutions and aspect ratios.

Technology
The design and specification of a document camera are a combination of several different technologies. The quality of the recorded image is dependent on the primary components, which are: optics, camera, lighting system and motherboard with appropriate firmware (software). The finished product is then realised by the production of different mechanical designs by individual manufacturers. Today High-Definition Document cameras are available with HDMI output, Audio/Video recording and playback is possible, and some High-Definition document cameras are also using high-speed WIFI technology to eliminate the need for cables.

Optics 

Optics are one of the most critical components relating to image quality, and the quality of the optical system used will largely depend on the planned cost of the device. Simple or highly complex optical systems can be used, which can differ significantly in both quality and size. The iris or aperture is another important component of the optics. The iris controls and regulates the amount of light that passes through the lens onto the image sensor. A lens will focus on exactly one point of an object to be imaged onto the sensor. However, there is also an area in front of and behind the point of focus that will be perceived as being in sharp focus by the human eye. This is called the depth of field, and it is dependent upon the size of the iris or aperture. (the smaller the aperture, the greater the depth of field).

Camera 
Progressive scan cameras use either CCD sensors or CMOS sensors. The general advantage of progressive scanning over the interlaced method is the much higher resolution that is the result. A progressive scan camera captures all scan lines at the same time, whereas an interlaced camera uses alternating sets of lines.

Basically, image sensors provide only monochrome images. With a 1-chip camera, colour information can be easily obtained through the use of colour filters over each pixel. With 1-chip cameras, the so-called Bayer filter is very common. Red, green and blue filters are arranged in a pattern. The number of green pixels is twice as large as that of the blue and red, thus the higher sensitivity and resolution of the human eye is replicated. To get a colour image, different algorithms are then used to interpolate the missing colour information.

A 3CCD camera module is another way to produce colour images. A prism is used to split white light into its red, green and blue components and a separate sensor is then used for each colour. This complex camera technology is used in 3-chip cameras and allows for excellent colour reproduction at very high resolutions.

Modern camera systems used in a document camera are able to provide high-resolution colour images at 30 frames per second.  In a 3-chip camera, the measured resolution may be up to 1500 lines. In addition, the image can be adapted to fit common display aspect ratios of 4:3, 16:9 and 16:10.

Lighting system 
Lighting is an essential part of a document camera. To ensure good colour rendition, the lighting system used to illuminate the image capture area should be as uniform as possible. The greater the light intensity, the more independent the document camera is from ambient light sources. Using powerful lighting systems enables smaller apertures to be used, and this in turn provides a significant increase in the depth of field that can be achieved by the document camera. Also, the higher the quality of the light source, the more light that will reach the camera sensor, and this results in less noticeable noise, and therefore the quality of image is not degraded.

Some document camera models integrate additional functionality into the light system, such as a synchronized light field that clearly indicates to the user at all times, by way of an illuminated image capture area or laser markers, the size and position of the imaging area, which adjusts simultaneously as the lens zooms in or out.

Motherboard and firmware 
The motherboard plays an important role in image processing and it has a major influence on the quality of the eventual image that is produced. Larger and larger resolutions and high refresh rates generate large amounts of data that must be processed in real-time.

Document cameras have a wide variety of sophisticated automated systems that are designed to make the user experience as easy as possible. Permanent autofocus detection, for example, automatically adjusts the focus settings when a new object is displayed, with no need for user intervention. Other important features include automatic auto iris, auto exposure, auto white balance and automatic gain control.

A document camera needs an image display device to show the information to the audience. Modern motherboards have a variety of connections to ensure flexibility of use. In addition to HDMI, DVI, VGA ports for connecting to displays, (projectors, monitors and video conferencing systems) there are also several interfaces provided to facilitate connection to a computer or interactive whiteboard. These interfaces are most commonly USB, Network (LAN) and serial.

In addition, an external PC or laptop can be connected to the document camera to allow for switching between a Power Point presentation and a live demonstration. Some models can also handle external storage devices and play files directly from a USB flash drive, or save images taken during the presentation onto it.

Some document camera manufacturers also provide for regular firmware upgrades, allowing users to have the opportunity to be equipped with, and benefit from new features as they become available.

Document camera types
Document cameras are generally divided into three groups. Smaller lightweight models are considered portable, larger sturdier and more stable units are known as desktop models, and the third group are ceiling visualizers. These are designed to be ceiling mounted above a tabletop or podium.

Portable and desktop models 
Portable and desktop models allow a similar working environment to that of an overhead projector. Many document camera users appreciate the added flexibility in terms of the variety of objects that can be displayed to an audience. Portable devices can be used in multiple locations without requiring any prior special installation.

Ceiling models 

Ceiling-mounted document cameras/visualizers are a variation from the traditional desktop models and allow for larger objects to be displayed. There is no desktop technical equipment to restrict the views of speaker and audience, as the technology is installed unobtrusively in the ceiling. Ceiling models are often used to support videoconferencing or telepresence systems to further enhance the immersive experience for participants.

References 

Cameras